Hommage is a 2021 South Korean film directed by Shin Su-won, starring Lee Jung-eun, Kwon Hae-hyo, Tang Jun-sang, and Lee Joo-shil. The film depicts a cinema time travel of a middle-aged film director that connects 1962 and 2022. It was released in theaters on May 26, 2022.

Synopsis 
Ji-wan (Lee Jung-eun), a middle-aged film director who is in a slump due to box office failures, crosses the present and the past while restoring the film The Female Judge by Hong Eun-won, a first-generation Korean female director who was active in the 1960s.

Cast
 Lee Jung-eun as Ji-wan
 Kwon Hae-hyo as Ji-wan's husband
 Tang Jun-sang as Ji-wan's son
 Lee Joo-shil
 Kim Ho-jung (special appearance)

Release 
Hommage was invited to the International Competition section at the 34th Tokyo International Film Festival where it had its world premier on October 31, 2021. It was also invited to the 69th Sydney Film Festival, the 18th Glasgow Film Festival, the  23rd Jeonju International Film Festival, and 21st Tribeca Film Festival. It won the Jury Award, the highest award at the 20th Florence Korean Film Festival. It was released theatrically on May 26, 2022 in South Korea.

Awards and nominations

References

External links
 
 
 
 

2021 films
2020s Korean-language films
South Korean drama films
Films about the film industry